This is a list of mystery anime.

A
Ajin: Demi-Human
Another
Attack on titan-shingeki no kyojin

BBlood+Blood-CBoogiepop PhantomBungou Stray DogsCCase Closed series

DDarker than BlackDeath NoteDeath ParadeEEden of the EastErasedErgo ProxyGGlass MaidenGhost HuntHHaruchikaHeaven's Memo PadHell Girl seriesHigurashi When They Cry seriesHyōkaKKarakurizōshi Ayatsuri SakonKyōto Teramachi Sanjō no HolmesKindaichi Case Files series

MMokkeMōryō no HakoMysterious JokerPParanoia AgentPsycho-PassRRampo Kitan: Game of LaplaceRed GardenRe:Zero - Starting Life in Another WorldSSorcerous Stabber Orphen: BeginningSorcerous Stabber Orphen: RevengeSorcerous Stabber Orphen: Wayward Journey (2020)T
 Tantei Opera Milky Holmes series
 Terror in Resonance Tantei Gakuen Q The Case Study of VanitasUUmineko: When They CryYYu Yu Hakusho''

References

Mystery